Vardar Macedonia (Macedonian and , Vardarska Makedonija) was the name given to the territory of the Kingdom of Serbia (1912–1918) and Kingdom of Yugoslavia (1918–1941) roughly corresponding to today's North Macedonia. It covers the northwestern part of geographical Macedonia, whose modern borders came to be defined by the mid-19th century.

History
Vardar Macedonia usually refers to the central part of the region of Macedonia attributed to the Kingdom of Serbia by the Treaty of Bucharest (1913) after the Balkan Wars. The territory is named after the Vardar, the major river that cuts across the region from northwest to southeast, to distinguish it from both Greek Macedonia and the region around the Pirin Mountain in Bulgaria.

The region was initially known as Serbian Macedonia although the use of the name Macedonia was prohibited later in the Kingdom of Yugoslavia, due to the implemented policy of Serbianisation of the local Slavic-speakers. From 1919 to 1922, the area (including parts of today Kosovo and Eastern Serbia) was part of South Serbia (Južna Srbija), 
In 1929, the Kingdom of Yugoslavia was divided into provinces called banovinas. Vardar Macedonia as part of South Serbia then became part of Vardar Banovina.

During World War I it was occupied by Bulgaria as part of the Military Inspection Area of Macedonia. After the war the present-day Strumica and Novo Selo municipalities were broken away from Bulgaria and ceded to Yugoslavia. During the Second World War, Bulgaria established two administrative districts in the region – Bitola and Skopje. In 1946, most of Vardar Macedonia as one of the six constituent countries of SFR Yugoslavia became the People's Republic of Macedonia (1946–1963) then the Socialist Republic of Macedonia (1963–1991). 

After the breakup of Yugoslavia, besides North Macedonia, the region encompasses also Trgovište and Preševo municipalities in Serbia, as well the Elez Han municipality in Kosovo. Sometimes in the region are included the areas of Golo Brdo and Mala Prespa in Albania.

Background

Yugoslavia

Republic of North Macedonia

See also
 Macedonia (Greece)
 Geography of North Macedonia
 Macedonia (terminology)
 Pirin Macedonia
 Vardar statistical region

Notes

References

Further reading
Danforth, L.M. (1997). The Macedonian Conflict: Ethnic Nationalism in a Transnational World. Princeton University Press. p. 44. 

 
Yugoslav Macedonia
Vardar Macedonia